Sanjeev Chopra (born 3 March 1961) is a retired IAS officer of the 1985 batch; from Kapurthala, Punjab. He is a resident of Dehradun, Uttarakhand. He is a former Director of the Lal Bahadur Shastri National Academy of Administration and has also written a book We, the People of the States of Bharat : The Making and Remaking of India's Internal Boundaries published in 2022. He is now the patron and honorary consultant to a literary festival: the Valley of Words International Literary Festival held annually in Dehradun, India.

Early life 
He studied at Lyallpur Khalsa College, Jalandhar, where he began his academic and literary g careers. While editing the college magazine, The Beas, he also published his first book of poems Ecstasy in 1978, and wrote regularly for youth magazines, besides conducting programs at the local radio station. For some time he worked as a journalist for The Economic Times, before clearing the Indian Civil Services Exam. This was followed by a bureaucratic career in India and abroad.

References

Living people
Indian Administrative Service officers
Indian male writers
1961 births